Braking for Whales is a 2019 American comedy-drama film directed by Sean McEwen and starring Tammin Sursok and Tom Felton.  Sursok co-wrote the screenplay with McEwen.

Cast 
Tammin Sursok as Star Walker
Addie Hoppers as Young Star
Tom Felton as Brandon Walker
Wendi McLendon-Covey as Aunt Jackie Hillhouse
David Koechner as Uncle Randall Hillhouse
Austin Swift as J.T.
Carrie Clifford as Park Ranger
Darron Dunbar as Ira Rhodes
Dylan Sandifer as Little Pepe
Brent Mendenhall as George W. Bush

Release 
The film's initial release was September 20, 2019 at the Boston Film Festival. Then it was released on VOD and digital platforms on April 24, 2020.

Reception 
Tara McNamara of Common Sense Media awarded the film three stars out of five.  Peter Sobczynski of RogerEbert.com gave the film one star.

References

External links 
 
 

2019 films
American comedy-drama films
2019 comedy-drama films
2010s English-language films
2010s American films